Perfumerías Avenida Baloncesto formerly C.B. Halcón Viajes, is a women's professional basketball team based in Salamanca, Spain. The team currently plays in the Liga Femenina de Baloncesto.

In 2011 Perfumerías Avenida won the Euroleague, and was runner-up in 2009 and 2021.

Season by season

Squad

Honours

National
 Liga Femenina (8)
 Champion: 2005–06, 2010–11, 2012–13, 2015–16, 2016–17, 2017–18, 2020–21, 2021-22
 Runner-up: 1995–96, 1998–99, 2006–07, 2007–08, 2008–09, 2009–10, 2011–12, 2013–14, 2014–15, 2018–19
 Copa de la Reina (10)
 Champion: 2005, 2006, 2012, 2014, 2015, 2017, 2018, 2019, 2020, 2022
 Runner-up: 2001, 2004, 2007, 2010, 2013, 2016
 Supercopa de España (9)
 Champion: 2010, 2011, 2012, 2013, 2014, 2016, 2017, 2018, 2020
 Runner-up: 2004, 2005, 2006, 2007, 2015, 2019, 2021
 Copa Castilla y León (16)
 Champion: 2001, 2002, 2003, 2004, 2005, 2007, 2008, 2009, 2011, 2013, 2014, 2015, 2017, 2018, 2020, 2021
 Runner-up: 2010, 2012, 2016, 2019

International
  EuroLeague Women (1)
 Champion: 2010–11.
Runner-up: 2008–09, 2020-21.
 FIBA Europe SuperCup Women (1)
 Champion: 2011
 EuroCup Women
Semifinals: 2005–06, 2017-18

MVP
Amaya Valdemoro (League 2001–02)
Nuria Martínez (Copa de la Reina 2005)
Laura Camps (Copa de la Reina 2006)
Anna Montañana (League 2007-08)
Sancho Lyttle (Supercopa 2010)
Alba Torrens (Euroleague 2010–11)
DeWanna Bonner (Supercopa 2011)
Erika de Souza (Copa de la Reina 2012)
Roneeka Hodges (Supercopa 2012)
Shay Murphy (Supercopa 2013)
Angelica Robinson (Copa de la Reina 2014)
Marta Xargay (Supercopa 2014)
Angelica Robinson (Copa de la Reina 2015)

External links
 Official website

Liga Femenina de Baloncesto teams
Women's basketball teams in Spain
EuroLeague Women clubs
Basketball teams in Castile and León
Basketball teams established in 1988
Sport in Salamanca